Ernest Cabat (July 7, 1914 – November 9, 1994) was an American artist.

Cabat studied art formally in New York in the 1920 and early 1930s, before starting a decades-long career in advertising, ceramics and painting. He worked in Manhattan for a number of significant advertising firms and industrial design studios, before moving to Tucson, Arizona, in 1942.  In Arizona, he and Norval Gill established the Cabat-Gill Advertising Agency.

The firm's work created and influenced the regional and charming mid-century brand of Arizona and the southwest. The firm developed and managed travel and marketing campaigns throughout Arizona and New Mexico.  In addition to his professional design work, Cabat was a sculptor, ceramicist and painter who won numerous awards and whose work is housed in various museums and private collections throughout the United States..

Life and work

Through his advertising firm he influenced the graphic aspects of southwestern advertising including TV, radio,  newspaper, magazines and marketing ephemera. His ceramic works were characteristic of the post WW-II modern era utilizing shapes colors and forms that have become synonymous with the mid-century modern movement. Towards the end of his career Cabat wrote and illustrated numerous publications and books on southwestern themes.

Marriage
Cabat was married to Rose Cabat, a significant and influential mid-century ceramic artist.

Death
Ernest Cabat died at age 80 on November 9, 1994 in Tucson, Arizona.

He was survived by his wife, their three children, and extended family.

References

External links
 Cabat Studio
 Waterloo Museum of Arts

1914 births
1994 deaths
20th-century American painters
American male painters
Artists from Tucson, Arizona
20th-century American architects
20th-century American sculptors
American male sculptors
Sculptors from Arizona
20th-century American male artists